Wayne Maki (November 10, 1944 – May 12, 1974) was a professional ice hockey player and an early star of the Vancouver Canucks in the National Hockey League (NHL).

Maki was born in Sault Ste. Marie, Ontario, and he was of Finnish descent. He broke into professional hockey in 1964 with the St. Louis Braves of the Central Hockey League (CPHL), and joined the Chicago Black Hawks at left wing for the 1967–68 season, playing the year with his older brother Chico Maki.

He was claimed by the St. Louis Blues in 1969. In a preseason game on September 21, 1969, Maki and Boston Bruins defenceman "Terrible" Ted Green engaged in a bloody, violent stick-swinging fight; Green was hit in the head and suffered a fractured skull and a brain injury. Maki and Green were both charged with assault as a result of the incident, the first time NHL players faced charges as a result of on-ice violence; both were acquitted. Maki was suspended by the NHL for 30 days. Maki was eventually sent down to the Buffalo Bisons of the American Hockey League (AHL). Later commentators have rated Maki's attack as one of the most vicious attacks in league history.

The Vancouver Canucks claimed Maki in the 1970 NHL Expansion Draft. The feisty winger caught on with the team and became one of the franchise's first stars, being among the team's leading scorers both of his full seasons with the team.  Maki played two-and-a-half seasons with Vancouver until being diagnosed with brain cancer in December 1972. He died on May 12, 1974, aged 29. The Canucks unofficially retired his number 11 jersey until Mark Messier, who had worn number 11 with the Edmonton Oilers and New York Rangers, joined the team in 1997. The Canucks allowed Messier to wear the number over the protest of Maki's family.

His NHL career statistics are: 246 games played, 57 goals, 79 assists, 136 points, and 184 penalty minutes in regular season play, and 2 games played, 1 goal, 0 assists, 1 point, and 2 penalty minutes in the playoffs.

Career statistics

See also
List of ice hockey players who died during their playing career

References

External links

CBC Sports Online: Top 10 Hockey Violence Lowlights

1944 births
1974 deaths
Buffalo Bisons (AHL) players
Canadian ice hockey left wingers
Chicago Blackhawks players
Deaths from brain tumor
Deaths from cancer in Ontario
Sportspeople from Sault Ste. Marie, Ontario
St. Catharines Black Hawks players
St. Louis Blues players
Vancouver Canucks players
Ice hockey people from Ontario
Canadian people of Finnish descent